A Sound of Thunder is a 2004 video game for the Game Boy Advance. The game was developed by former Möbius Entertainment and published by BAM! Entertainment. It was released first in Europe on February 28, 2004 before arriving in North America on February 1, 2005. The story is based loosely both on the original short story by Ray Bradbury of the same name and follows more closely the plot of the 2005 movie. The game was originally also planned for home sixth generation game consoles, including Microsoft Xbox, Nintendo GameCube and the Sony PlayStation 2, but these were canceled as of December 2006.

Plot 
The game mostly follows the plot of the film and retains some of the characters. Travis Ryer is a guide and biologist for Time Safari Inc. (TSI), a company which provides time-travel hunting safaris for the rich. After a time tourist alters the course of events in the late Cretaceous, the future begins to change as "time waves" bring further consequences due to the butterfly's absence from the course of history. Dinosaur-like creatures soon run rampant, and the world becomes progressively overgrown with tropical vegetation.

Travis learns from Dr. Sonia Rand, inventor of the time machine, that a butterfly was brought back from the past on the last safari. He tries going back to reset the timeline, but is turned back by a "cleanup crew" from TSI. The crew disappears, however, due to the changes in history. Ryer gets in contact with one of the tourists, Ted Eckles (spelled Eckels in the film), who informs him it was his friend Christian Middleton who was responsible. On the way to Middleton's place, Eckles is killed as a time wave arrives. Middleton is discovered dead, but Ryer manages to retrieve the butterfly, get back to TSI and enter the time machine. Right afterwards, a time wave arrives and gets rid of the vegetation and animals, implying the timeline was set right.

Gameplay 
The game is an overhead shooter, played from an isometric perspective. The objective is to complete each mission by killing mutants, solving push-the-crate puzzles and completing the occasional driving stage until the end of the level is reached. Along the way, the player can earn points for collecting items, killing enemies, completing the level within a certain time and exploring all the rooms. The player can resume progress via a six-letter password-based save, which does not, however, retain the player's scores.

The game provides an array of collectible weapons, which automatically lock onto enemies. One of them, the Time Freeze Disruptor, can slow down the player's surroundings while allowing the player to move at regular speed (similar to bullet time). Most weapons rely on collectible ammo, but the electric prod only needs to be charged by holding down the fire button before use. The game can be played alone or in co-op via Link Cable. The Link Cable also allows for a single-cartridge deathmatch with up to four players in a special arena.

Reception 

The game is better received than its critical and commercial failure of the film counterpart which the game is based on. The game received criticism for its password-based save system and praise for its single-cart multiplayer mode.

References

External links 
 

Action-adventure games
Game Boy Advance games
Game Boy Advance-only games
Cancelled GameCube games
Cancelled PlayStation 2 games
Cancelled Xbox games
2004 video games
Video games based on films
Video games developed in the United Kingdom
Video games set in prehistory
Dinosaurs in video games
Video games based on adaptations
Works based on short fiction